The boroselenites are heteropoly anion chemical compounds containing selenite and borate groups linked by common oxygen atoms. They are not to be confused with the boroselenates with have a higher oxidation state for selenium, and extra oxygen. If selenium is replaced by sulfur, it would be a borosulfite. Boroselenites are distinct from selenoborates in which selenium replaces oxygen in borate, or perselenoborates which contain Se-Se bonds as well as Se-B bonds. The metal boroselenites were only discovered in 2012.

List

References 

Borates
Selenites